Alan Holdsworth (born 1952 in Salford, stage name Johnny Crescendo) is a British musician and disability activist living in Philadelphia, United States.

The 2022 BBC Two  docudrama Then Barbara Met Alan tells the story of Holdsworth and Barbara Lisicki and their work with the Disabled People's Direct Action Network.

Holdsworth has been affected by polio and uses a wheelchair.

References

Further reading
 Interview

External links
Johnny Crescendo on Facebook

1952 births
Living people
People from Salford
British disability rights activists
People with polio
Wheelchair users